Alexis Cruz (born September 29, 1974) is an American actor, known for his performances as Rafael in Touched by an Angel and as Skaara in Stargate and Stargate SG-1.

Biography
Cruz was born in The Bronx of Puerto Rican descent. His mother, Julia, was a songwriter. He currently resides in Los Angeles. He started his acting career when he was 9. However, when he was 13, and was auditioning for a role, the director explained to him that he was a bad actor, so Cruz decided to enter The School of Performing Arts that same year.

Cruz appeared as assistant D.A. Martin Allende in the legal drama Shark, with co-stars James Woods and Jeri Ryan. In the 1998 film Why Do Fools Fall In Love, Cruz played the role of Herman Santiago, one of the original members of the rock and roll group The Teenagers. Along with Erick Avari, he is one of only two actors to appear in both the original Stargate film and the spin-off series Stargate SG-1.

Filmography

Film

Television

Videogames

See also 
 List of Puerto Ricans

References

External links
Alexis Cruz On The Net - Official Fansite

Alexis Cruz Fan Page ( ( 2009-10-25)
Stargate Wiki: Alexis Cruz

1974 births
Male actors from New York City
People from the Bronx
American male film actors
American male television actors
American people of Puerto Rican descent
Hispanic and Latino American male actors
Living people
Male actors from California
People from Los Angeles